Verburg is a Dutch toponymic surname. It is a contraction of "Van der Burg", meaning "from the fortress / stronghold".  Variants are Verborg, Verburch, Verburgh and Verburgt. Notable people with the surname include:

Adriaan Verburgh (died 1602), Dutch painter
David Verburg (born 1991), American sprinter
Dionys Verburg (1655–1722), Dutch landscape painter
Gerda Verburg (born 1957), Dutch diplomat, politician and trade union leader
JoAnn Verburg (born 1950), American photographer
Nicolaas Verburg (c.1620–1676), Dutch Governor of Formosa and Director General of the VOC council in Batavia

References

Dutch-language surnames
Toponymic surnames